Pinter is a Hungarian surname. Notable people with the surname include:

Ádám Pintér (born 1988), Hungarian football player
Anina Pinter, Los Angeles-based costume designer
Attila Pintér (footballer born 1966), Hungarian football player and coach
Attila Pintér (footballer born 1978), Hungarian football player
Avrohom Pinter (1949–2020), British Haredi rabbi
Colleen Zenk Pinter (born 1953), American actress
Csaba Pintér (born 1967), bass player of Hungarian band Pokolgép
Danny Pinter (born 1996), American football player
Ferenc Pinter (1931–2008), Italian painter and illustrator
Frances Pinter (born 1950), British publisher
Friedrich Pinter (born 1978), Austrian biathlete
Harold Pinter (1930–2008), British playwright
Hilda Pinter (born 1932), Hungarian canoer
István Pintér (1831–1875), Hungarian Slovene writer
János Pintér (born 1936), Hungarian long-distance runner
Jason Pinter (born 1979), American author
József Pintér (born 1953), Hungarian chess Grandmaster
Jürgen Pinter (born 1979), Austrian skier
László Ernő Pintér (born 1942), Hungarian priest and malacologist
László Pintér (born 1983), Hungarian football player
László Pintér (politician) (born 1950), Hungarian politician
Mark Pinter (born 1950), American actor
Michal Pintér (born 1994), Slovak football player
Robert B. Pinter (1937–2001), American biomedical engineer
Sándor Pintér (born 1948), Hungarian politician
Sándor Pintér (footballer) (born 1950), Hungarian football midfielder
Tomislav Pinter (1926–2008), Croatian cinematographer
Zoltán Pintér (born 1977), Hungarian football player